The Cuevas Blancas Windmill or White Caves Mill is located in Santa María del Mar, Santa Cruz de Tenerife, on the island of Tenerife, Spain. It was used to manufacture Gofio, a type of flour from the Canary islands.

It has three floors: a warehouse (and occasional miller's bedroom) on the ground floor, a waiting room on the first floor, and the mill machinery on the second floor. It has a pointed roof containing a wooden turning mechanism: one side has the blades, while the other has the rudder, with a connecting beam and gearing. It is similar to the Barranco Grande Windmill.

It was restored in 1974, but has since been abandoned, and is falling apart in the middle of a building warehouse. It was listed as Bien de Interés Cultural on 18 December 2007.

References 

Buildings and structures in Santa Cruz de Tenerife
Windmills in Spain